Carabamba District is one of four districts of the province Julcán in Peru.

References